Lalli Simo Samuli Partinen (20 August 1941 – 4 May 2022) was a Finnish professional ice hockey player who played in the SM-liiga.

Biography
Partinen played for HIFK and SaiPa. He competed in the men's tournament at the 1968 Winter Olympics. Partinen also represented Finland at the Hockey World Championships during the years: 1965, 1966, 1969, 1970, 1973. He also won two Finnish championships in seasons 1969–70 and 1973–74. He was inducted into the Finnish Hockey Hall of Fame in 1987.

Partinen died of COVID-19 at a hospital in Lappeenranta on 4 May 2022, aged 80.

Honours
HIFK Hockey
 Finnish Ice Hockey Championship: 1969–70, 1973–74

References

External links
 Finnish Hockey Hall of Fame bio

1941 births
2022 deaths
HIFK (ice hockey) players
SaiPa players
Ice hockey players with retired numbers
Olympic ice hockey players of Finland
Ice hockey players at the 1968 Winter Olympics
People from Kannonkoski
Deaths from the COVID-19 pandemic in Finland
Sportspeople from Central Finland